Thomas Thudin (born 30 July 1973) is a former Swedish footballer who is assistant goalkeeper coach at AIK.

References

External links

Fotbolltransfers profile

1973 births
Living people
Association football goalkeepers
Väsby IK players
Assyriska FF players
Åtvidabergs FF players
Allsvenskan players
Superettan players
Swedish footballers
AFC Eskilstuna players
Allsvenskan managers
Swedish football managers